Prince Badi Ajamu (born January 24, 1972, in Camden, New Jersey) — nicknamed the Boxing Prince — is best known for taking a fight against former champion Roy Jones Jr.

Pro career

Ajamu was undefeated until July 5, 2003, when he lost in a unanimous decision to Rico Hoye.  He is currently being trained by the legendary trainer Buddy McGirt.
Ajamu is best known for fighting Roy Jones Jr. in a fight that took place on July 29, 2006, with Jones winning the fight in a lopsided unanimous decision.

Comeback
Ajamu came back after that loss to Jones on January 19, 2007, to stop Craig Cummings for the Vacant World Boxing Foundation (WBFo) and NBA titles.
On July 31, 2009, Ajamu beat DeAndrey Abron by UD for the Vacant NBA Light Heavyweight title.

Titles Held
Pennsylvania State Light Heavyweight Title
IBC Intercontinental Light Heavyweight
WBC Continental Americas Light Heavyweight title
WBC Caribbean Boxing Federation (CABOFE) Light Heavyweight title
WBO NABO Light Heavyweight title
World Boxing Foundation Light Heavyweight title
NBA Light Heavyweight Title (2 times)

Professional boxing record

References

External links
 
One-on-One interview with Ajamu (2004)

1972 births
Living people
Sportspeople from Camden, New Jersey
Light-heavyweight boxers
American male boxers